The 2007 Rhein Fire season was the 13th and final season for the franchise in the NFL Europa League (NFLEL). The team was led by head coach Rick Lantz in his first year, and played its home games at LTU arena in Düsseldorf, Germany. They finished the season in fourth place with a record of four wins and six losses. The National Football League (NFL) announced the closure of its European branch on June 29, ending the team's 13-year existence.

Offseason

Free agent draft

Personnel

Staff

Roster

Schedule

Standings

Game summaries

Week 1: vs Berlin Thunder

Week 2: at Amsterdam Admirals

Week 3: vs Cologne Centurions

Week 4: at Hamburg Sea Devils

Week 5: vs Frankfurt Galaxy

Week 6: at Cologne Centurions

Week 7: at Frankfurt Galaxy

Week 8: vs Amsterdam Admirals

Week 9: at Berlin Thunder

Week 10: vs Hamburg Sea Devils

Honors
Danny Baugher, All-NFL Europa League team selection
Blake Costanzo, All-NFL Europa League team selection
Jamar Enzor, Defensive Player of the Week (Week 9)
Carlos Hendricks, Defensive Player of the Week (Week 8)
Derek Rehage, Defensive Player of the Week (Week 6)
P.K. Sam, Offensive Player of the Week (Week 5)

Notes

References

Rhein
Rhein Fire seasons
Rhein
Rhein